VelociCoaster (marketed as Jurassic World VelociCoaster) is a launched roller coaster at Universal's Islands of Adventure in Orlando, Florida. Manufactured by Intamin and themed to the Velociraptors from the Jurassic World film franchise, the ride officially opened on June 10, 2021. It is located in the Islands of Adventure's Jurassic Park area, occupying the site of the former Triceratops Encounter attraction.

History

Construction
Universal Orlando hired Intamin to construct a new ride to replace the inactive Triceratops Encounter attraction, which had been closed for nearly a decade. The initiative, dubbed "Project 791" in permits filed by the park, would be the third collaboration between both parties following Harry Potter and the Escape from Gringotts (2014) and Hagrid's Magical Creatures Motorbike Adventure (2019). The permits filed in 2018 called for the demolition and site clearing of Triceratops Encounter, signaling to the public that a new attraction may be coming. Construction walls were erected in January 2019, and project documents were leaked online shortly after showing an overhead layout of a proposed roller coaster project.

Construction entered full swing by the spring of 2019, with the removal of Triceratops Encounter and the clearing of unused land in and around the park's existing Discovery Centre building. A bridge connecting The Lost Continent and Jurassic Park areas was also razed. In June 2019, the first pieces of track for the unannounced coaster were delivered and stored offsite. In July 2019, Universal Parks & Resorts filed a trademark with the United States Patent and Trademark Office for the name "VelociCoaster", which fans quickly deduced to be the name of the new unannounced coaster.

In early 2020, following months of concrete groundwork and further preparation, the extensive collection of track and supports already in storage were delivered to the construction site and installed. Construction was temporarily halted during the initial COVID-19 lockdown and later resumed at a rapid pace. Much of the construction was completed by the time Universal Orlando Resort was cleared to reopen in June 2020, attracting the unreserved attention of park guests and local media.

Announcement and further preparation

Universal initially refused to confirm that it was constructing a roller coaster, even after the ride had been topped out. On September 28, 2020, Universal formally announced the new ride as Jurassic World VelociCoaster, billing it as a "new species of roller coaster" and the tallest and fastest launch coaster in Florida. It was confirmed that the ride would feature twelve airtime moments, a  zero-g stall, and a barrel roll over the lagoon for its finale.

Universal continued to release new information on VelociCoaster before the ride's 2021 scheduled opening. In December 2020, closeups of the trains were published, and early testing was underway. In January 2021, VelociCoaster hosted its first riders. More details surrounding the specs of the new coaster were released shortly after, including its  drop at an 80-degree angle and the use of a lap bar instead of an over-the-shoulder restraint.

Construction walls around the construction area were taken down in late February 2021, giving park guests better views of the new coaster. In April 2021, VelociCoaster's official opening date was announced. A soft opening to press and enthusiasts was hosted on May 7, 2021, and the ride was well-received. An official on-ride point-of-view video was released to the public on May 28. The attraction formally opened on June 10, 2021, with guests waiting in the queue for up to four hours. It became the fastest roller coaster at any Universal park upon opening, beating The Incredible Hulk Coaster (1999).

Ride experience

Queue
The queue begins outside the lower floor of the Discovery Center. Two raptor statues are on display at the entrance. The paddock features glowing neon lights, and the coaster can be occasionally seen launching outside the building. For lines that stretch outdoor, there is an extended queue area that provides close-up views of the coaster's track, as well as shade and cooling fans. Inside, guests see more raptor statues and eventually move into a room with six windows overlooking the ride track. A video projection special effect is used to show a Velociraptor chasing each coaster train as it passes by. Inside one of the windows, guests can find a clipboard and a radar gun. In another is a cup with permanent ripples referencing the first Jurassic Park film. Guests then enter a room with a video presentation by Dr. Henry Wu. There are a few lockers with various items, such as football equipment, raptor toys, and books. Guests enter an examination room where two animatronic Velociraptors are caged and muzzled. 

The examination room is followed by the lockers area, where guests can secure loose articles. They are unique for their two-way design, in which a door swings open on one side to insert belongings, and then swings open on the other side as guests exit the ride and retrieve them. In addition, a family room can be found in this area, where guests can wait here while others ride the coaster. The family room contains a TV monitor that plays the Jurassic World Camp Cretaceous series by Netflix. VelociCoaster is one of the three roller coasters at Universal Orlando to have metal detectors, with the others being The Incredible Hulk Coaster and Hollywood Rip Ride Rockit. Prior to reaching the metal detectors, there are advertisement posters of fictional Jurassic World attractions, such as Gyrosphere Valley, T-Rex Kingdom, and the Mosasaurus show. The posters also show attractions that exist at Islands of Adventure, such as Jurassic Park: River Adventure. After passing the metal detectors, guests walk up a flight of stairs into a final pre-show room displaying a video with characters Claire Dearing and Owen Grady. In the video, Grady rebukes the idea of taking a ride on VelociCoaster and tries to discourage guests as well. The room features various Jurassic World props on display including zappers, net guns, a waiver and a dino tracker. Guests then reach the station, where they board the train.

Layout
The loading area is to the west of the queue. Once exiting the station, riders take an S-turn into the pre-launch sequence, where Owen warns the riders one last time and Velociraptors can be seen on either side of the track. Immediately after the launch track, the train passes through a Jr. Immelmann through some rock work. The train dives down and back up through a dive loop. The train turns to the left as it dives under itself and snaps back to the right, where the on-ride camera is located. The train heads through an overbanked turn and rises up into an off-axis airtime hill. The ride rises through the rock work via a turnaround, and completes a downward S-bend, where the train passes Blue and Charlie, two of the four Velociraptors seen on the ride. The train goes through another overbanked turn and hits a sharp S-bend, passing Delta and Echo, and going through some more rock work. The ride then rises up into a 125-degree overbanked turn, then heads into an outerbanked airtime hill. The ride enters a 133-degree overbanked turn and passes over a speed hill. This is followed by an off-axis airtime hill before reaching the brake run. As the train returns to the station, Owen thanks the riders before being called to a situation at the River Adventure.

Reception

References

External links
 Official Website

Jurassic Park in amusement parks
Amusement rides based on film franchises
Islands of Adventure
Roller coasters introduced in 2021
2021 establishments in Florida
Roller coasters in Orlando, Florida
Roller coasters in Florida
Roller coasters operated by Universal Parks & Resorts
Best New Roller Coaster winners